The Platzspitz park is a park in Zurich (Switzerland), located next to the Swiss National Museum and Zürich Hauptbahnhof.

History
History of the park goes back to the Middle Ages. Positioned between the Sihl and Limmat rivers, it was originally used as a hunting and shooting ground in the 14th century, and by the end of the 18th century the park was also adorned with beautiful Baroque architecture.

During the 1980s, heroin users would frequently gather at the park, and attempts to disperse them merely resulted in them regrouping elsewhere. Thus in 1987 the authorities chose to allow illegal drug use and sales at the park, in an effort to contain Zurich's growing drug problem. Police were not allowed to enter the park or make arrests. Clean needles were given out to addicts as part of the Zurich Intervention Pilot Project, or ZIPP-AIDS program. However, lack of control over what went on in the park caused a multitude of problems. Drug dealers and users arrived from all over Europe, and crime became rampant as dealers fought for control and addicts (who numbered up to 1,000 ) stole to support their habit. The once-beautiful gardens had degraded into a mess of mud and used needles, and the emergency services were overwhelmed with the number of overdoses, which were almost nightly. Platzspitz, or Needle Park as it was then known, became a source of embarrassment to the Zurich municipal council and in 1992, police moved in to clear up the park. The drug scene then moved to the adjacent area of Letten railway station, which closed services in 1989. This spot was also cleared by police in 1995.

Today Platzspitz has been cleaned up and restored, and is presented by the authorities as a peaceful, family-friendly garden.

National Exhibition Vestige
One structure that stands out is the gazebo that stands just behind the Swiss National Museum. It is very close to Zurich's main railway station. The Gazebo is a vestige of the first Switzerland's National Exhibition of 1883. It was first built to be a musical pavilion, a function it still serves to this day.

References

Parks in Zürich
Altstadt (Zürich)
Drugs in Switzerland
Heroin
Sihl
Limmat